Joachim Heinrich Seelig (born 29 March 1942 in Cologne) is a German physical chemist and specialist in NMR Spectroscopy. He is one of the founding fathers of the Biozentrum of the University of Basel.

Life 
Joachim Seelig studied chemistry and physics from 1961 till 1966 at the University of Cologne. In 1968 he graduated with a doctorate under the guidance of Manfred Eigen at the Max Planck Institute for Biophysical Chemistry in Göttingen. As a postdoc he conducted research on electron spin resonance at Stanford University in 1968/69. In 1970 he moved as a postdoc to the Institute of Physical Chemistry at the University of Basel where he became a group leader and assistant professor in 1972. He became full professor in 1974 and in 1982 Professor of Structural Biology at the Biozentrum of the University of Basel.

Work 
Joachim Seelig developed biophysical methods for studying the structure and thermodynamic properties of biological cell membranes.  He investigated the interactions of proteins and lipids by EPR-spectroscopy, deuterium  and phosphorus nuclear magnetic resonance, neutron diffraction and calorimetric methods. The quantitative characterization of the biological membrane became the international standard for further theoretical studies. His second field of research was magnetic resonance imaging (MRI) and magnetic resonance spectroscopy (MRS) in the human and animals. With C-13 NMR the metabolism in the human and animal brain could be traced in a non-invasive manner. With faster MRI imaging techniques the tonotopy of the human brain has been described.

Awards and honors 
1987 Cloëtta Prize, Prof. Cloëtta Foundation, Zurich
1991 Bijvoet Medal of the Bijvoet Center for Biomolecular Research, Utrecht University, NL
1994 Heinrich Wieland Prize, Munich
2000 Applied Physical Chemistry Award 2000, European Society for applied Physical Chemistry 
2003 Foreign membership of the Royal Netherlands Academy of Arts and Sciences
2005 Avanti Award in Lipids, Biophysical Society (USA)

References

External links 
Official website
Emeriti, Biozentrum, University of Basel
Member of the Academia Europaea
"People" in: i-net innovation networks

Living people
20th-century German chemists
21st-century German chemists
Academic staff of the University of Basel
Members of Academia Europaea
Members of the Royal Netherlands Academy of Arts and Sciences
Biozentrum University of Basel
University of Basel alumni
Bijvoet Medal recipients
1942 births